is a district located in Iburi Subprefecture, Hokkaido, Japan.

As of 2004, the district has an estimated population of 20,866 and a density of 49.01 persons per km2. The total area is 425.75 km2.

Towns and villages
Shiraoi

Districts in Hokkaido